John Paul Cruickshank (born 18 January 1960) is an English former professional footballer who played in the Football League as a midfielder.

References

1960 births
Living people
People from Oldham
English footballers
Footballers from Oldham
Association football midfielders
Blackpool F.C. players
Bury F.C. players
Altrincham F.C. players
English Football League players
National League (English football) players